The final of the 1983 Cricket World Cup was played between India and the West Indies at Lord's on 25 June 1983. This was the third consecutive World Cup final appearance for the West Indies, having won the last two Cricket World Cups. India, playing in their first final, defeated the West Indies to claim their first World Cup title.

Background
The match was the third consecutive World Cup final hosted at Lord's, following those in 1975 and 1979. India was making their first appearance at a World Cup final after defeating England by 6 wickets in the first semi-finals. This was also the first appearance by an Asian nation in a World Cup final. In fact, in the prior two world cups in 1975 and 1979, the Indian team had won only one match (against East Africa) and lost every other match.  On the other hand, the West Indies had won both previous editions of the World Cup. They had reached a third consecutive final after defeating Pakistan by 8 wickets in the second semi-final and were looking for their third consecutive World Cup win.

As a result, the Indian team was only given odds of 66-1 at the start of the final.

Match details

After losing the toss, India was asked to bat first against a West Indies team that arguably boasted the world's best bowling attack. Sunil Gavaskar, who had a generally unsuccessful tournament, got dismissed early on for two. A partnership between Krishnamachari Srikkanth and Mohinder Amarnath took India past the 50 mark, before the former was taken lbw by Marshall. Amarnath was then bowled by Holding for 26, and only two more runs were made before Yashpal Sharma fell. Kapil Dev, the Indian captain, took 8 balls to reach 15, but was caught off the bowling of Larry Gomes; while Kirti Azad fell for a duck, leaving India at 111/6. Roger Binny was caught on two, while Sandeep Patil made 27 to get India to 153/8. All rounder Madan Lal soon followed for 17, and 10th wicket partnership made 22 runs before Michael Holding bowled Syed Kirmani for 14. India were thus bowled out for 183 in 54.4 overs, which many thought was easily reachable. Andy Roberts had claimed three wickets, and Malcolm Marshall, Michael Holding and Larry Gomes took two wickets each

The West Indies set out to chase the low target of 184, but lost an early wicket when Balwinder Sandhu famously clean bowled Gordon Greenidge. Desmond Haynes and Viv Richards, batted smoothly past 50, but both batsmen were removed by the bowling of Madan Lal, leaving the West Indies at 57/3. Lal soon claimed a third wicket - that of Gomes - and Dev then caught West Indies captain Clive Lloyd, leaving the West Indies at 66/5. Ten runs later, Faoud Bacchus was removed by Sandhu. Jeff Dujon and Malcolm Marshall put on a partnership of 43 runs before Amarnath dismissed them on 119 and 124 respectively. Soon, Kapil Dev trapped Andy Roberts for an lbw, and Amarnath got Michael Holding out LBW. The West Indies were thus all out for 140, and India had won their maiden Cricket World Cup by 43 runs. The Indian bowlers had completed one of the biggest upsets in cricket history, defeating the previously invincible West Indies. Both Amarnath and Lal had taken three wickets for India, while Sandhu claimed two. Amarnath was awarded the Man of the Match for his all-round performance. There was no "Man of the Series" award in 1983.

Scorecard

Indian Innings

Fall of wickets 1-2 (Sunil Gavaskar), 2–59 (Krishnamachari Srikkanth), 3–90 (Mohinder Amarnath), 4–92 (Yashpal Sharma), 5–110 (N Kapil Dev), 6–111 (Kirti Azad), 7–130 (Roger Binny), 8–153 (Sandeep Patil), 9–161 (Madan Lal), 10–183 (Syed Kirmani)

West Indies Innings

Fall of wickets 1-5 (Greenidge), 2-50 (Haynes), 3-57 (Richards), 4-66 (Gomes), 5-66 (Lloyd), 6-76 (Bacchus), 7-119 (Dujon), 8-124 (Marshall), 9-126 (Roberts), 10-140 (Holding)

See also

 ICC Cricket World Cup

References

External links
Scorecards of all the 1983 World Cup matches
1983 Final Highlights video on Veoh
Cricket World Cup 1983 from Cricinfo

Final, 1983 Cricket World Cup
Sports competitions in England
Cricket World Cup Final, 1983
Cricket World Cup Final, 1983
International cricket competitions from 1980–81 to 1985
Cricket World Cup Finals
1983 sports events in London
Cricket World Cup final
Lord's
Cricket in London

es:Copa mundial de críquet de 1983
fr:Coupe du monde de cricket de 1983
it:Coppa del Mondo di cricket 1983
ml:ക്രിക്കറ്റ് ലോകകപ്പ് 1983
mr:क्रिकेट विश्वचषक, १९८३
nl:Wereldkampioenschap cricket 1983
pt:Copa do Mundo de Críquete de 1983